Calvario F.C. is a Honduran football club, based in Langue, Honduras that plays in the Honduran Liga Mayor, the third-highest division overall in Honduran football.  Founded as Calvario F.C. in 2012, they were invited to play at the 2015 Honduran Cup as Atlético Calvario.

Calvario F.C. has won the local Langue League twice.

References

Football clubs in Honduras
Association football clubs established in 2012
2012 establishments in Honduras